Zero Night: The Untold Story of the Second World War's Most Daring Great Escape is a 2014 book by Mark Felton.  It is about the 1942 mass allied escape from the German prisoner-of-war camp Oflag VI-B.

Reception
Zero Night has generally been well received.  The Wall Street Journal wrote "From the book’s subtitle (“The Untold Story of World War II’s Greatest Escape”) through its text, “Zero Night” invites comparison with Paul Brickhill’s “The Great Escape” (1950), which recounts a later Allied breakout. The latter is a better book, more polished, the prisoners—and even the Germans—depicted more three-dimensionally. (It’s relevant to note that Brickhill was a POW in the camp from which his subjects escaped.) Moreover, I couldn’t help wondering if Mr. Felton overidealizes the officer POWs in “Zero Night.” .. But escape narratives are almost always foolproof—i.e., suspenseful—and the events chronicled in “Zero Night,” diligently assembled by Mr. Felton, are engrossing enough to keep readers reading through to the end." and concluded "Films like “The Great Escape” and “Von Ryan’s Express” are fun escapist (no pun intended) fare. But a book like “Zero Night” reminds us that the real Allied escapees were often far more enthralling and admirable than those movies’ characters could ever be."  Gulf News calls it "nothing short of a thriller, where the plot is laid out, preparation progresses stage-by-stage and finally brought to fruition." while News Weekly wrote "Zero Night is a fascinating recount of this lesser known escape story, and would appeal to a wide range of readers." Kirkus Reviews in a star review called it "a page-turner" and "exciting" and BookBrowse wrote "Fantastically intimate and told with a novelist's eye for drama and detail, this rip-roaring adventure is all the more thrilling because it really happened."

References

External links
 book page on author's website
 Library holdings of Zero Night (2015 edition)

2014 non-fiction books
Books about World War II
English non-fiction books
1942 in Germany
Oflags
Prisoners of war in popular culture
Icon Books books